Coahomasuchus is an extinct genus of aetosaurine aetosaur. Remains of the genus have been found from deposits in Texas and North Carolina that date to the Otischalkian faunachron (lower late Carnian) of the Late Triassic. The dorsal plates are distinctively flat and unflexed, and have a faint sub-parallel to radial ornamentation. The genus lacked spines or keels on these plates, features seen in many other aetosaurs. Coahomasuchus was very similar in appearance to the closely related Aetosaurus.

Two species of Coahomasuchus are known. C. kahleorum, the type species, was named by Heckert and Lucas in 1999; it is known from the Colorado City Formation of the Dockum Group. C. chathamensis, a second species named by Heckert et al. in 2017, is from the Pekin Formation of the Newark Supergroup. The holotype of the latter species contains parts of the skull, which is rare among aetosaurs. C. chathamensis differs from C. kahleorum by wider osteoderms on the back and the underside of the neck, as well as the relative lengths of the processes of the surangular.

References

External links

Coahomasuchus at Palaeos

Aetosaurs of North America
Prehistoric pseudosuchian genera